The 1955 World Sportscar Championship season was the third season of FIA World Sportscar Championship motor racing. It featured a series of six endurance races for sportscars, contested from 23 January to 16 October 1955.

The championship was won by Mercedes-Benz, the German manufacturer ending the dominance of Ferrari which had won both of the previous World Sportscar Championship titles.

Season summary
 

The 1955 World Sports Car Championship was contested over a six race series. With legendary races such as the Mille Miglia and the RAC Tourist Trophy now part of an international race calendar, they were accompanied by the 24 Hours of Le Mans and 12 Hours of Sebring. The championship started in January, with a trip to Argentina for the 1000 km Buenos Aires and ended with an event new to the championship, the legendary road race, the Targa Florio. As a result of the Le Mans disaster, both the 1000 km Nürburgring and the Carrera Panamericana were cancelled.

The Championship was open for manufacturers, with works teams such as Scuderia Ferrari, Officine Alfieri Maserati, Daimler-Benz and Jaguar Cars leading the way, but the majority of the fields were made up of amateur or gentlemen drivers, often up against professional racing drivers with experience in Formula One.  

Classes were split between closed cars (GT) and open cars (Sports), with further divisions due to engine displacement. The 1955 season was a very bittersweet one for Daimler-Benz, with their Mercedes-Benz 300 SLRs. After missing the opening two, non-European rounds, which allowed Ferrari to gain a 14-point head start on Mercedes, the German team joined the championship. Aided by an English journalist, Denis Jenkinson, Stirling Moss would romp to victory in the Mille Miglia. However the elation achieved by this English pairing, would be quickly subdued at Le Mans a month later, when Pierre Levegh’s 300 SLR would be launched into the air and into the crowd, killing more than 80 spectators. Daimler-Benz would withdraw from the race, and motor sport altogether at the end of the season.

This difficult decision would be made a little easier when Moss, and John Fitch drove to victory at the Dundrod Circuit, winning the RAC Tourist Trophy. This race was marred by the deaths of three drivers. The victory put Mercedes back in the hunt for the championship. The last race of the season, the Targa Florio, would see Moss win again, this time aided by Peter Collins, ensuring the manufacturers title was won by the German marque.

Season results

Race results

Championship standings

Note: 

Championship points were awarded for the first six places in each race in the order of 8-6-4-3-2-1.
Manufacturers were awarded points only for their highest finishing car with no points awarded for positions filled by additional cars.
Only the best 4 results out of the 6 races could be retained by each manufacturer. Points earned but not counted towards the championship totals are listed within brackets in the accompanying table.

The cars
The following models contributed to the net championship point scores of their respective manufacturers.  

 Mercedes-Benz 300 SLR
 Ferrari 375 Plus, Ferrari 750 Monza, Ferrari 857 S, Ferrari 376 S & Ferrari 735 LM
 Jaguar D-Type
 Maserati A6GCS & Maserati 300S
 Aston Martin DB3S
 Porsche 550 Spyder
 Gordini T24S
 Austin-Healey 100S

References

Further reading
 János L. Wimpffen, Time and Two Seats, 1999, pages 170–200
 The Automobile Year Book of Sports Car Racing, 1982

External links
 Championship race results & points table at wspr-racing.com
 Championship race results, programs and images at www.racingsportscars.com

 
World Sportscar Championship seasons
World